The Jamaican men's national under-20 ice hockey team is the national under-20 ice hockey team of Jamaica. They are controlled by the Jamaican Olympic Ice Hockey Federation and has been an associate member of the International Ice Hockey Federation (IIHF) since 18 May 2012. The team have not entered in any World Junior Championship tournaments so far.

All-time record against other clubs
Last match update: 24 June 2018

References

External links
Official Website of the Jamaican Olympic Ice Hockey Federation

Ice hockey in Jamaica
Junior national ice hockey teams
I